Arthur Andrews (26 August 1856 – 26 February 1943) was an English first-class cricketer who played his games for  Hampshire County Cricket Club.   His highest score of 62*  came when playing for Hampshire  in the match against Sussex County Cricket Club.

References

English cricketers
Hampshire cricketers
1856 births
1943 deaths